The Battle of Messkirch on 5 May 1800 was the major engagement in the War of the Second Coalition. It followed the Battle of Stockach on 3 May. The campaign began on 25 April when a French force emerged from the Kehl bridgehead. This marked the start of the offensive of Jean Victor Marie Moreau's Army of the Rhine against Paul Kray's army of Habsburg Austria and its Bavarian, Württemberg and other German allies.

French Army

Headquarters

 
Commanding General: General-in-Chief Jean Victor Marie Moreau
 Chief of Staff: General of Division Jean-Joseph, Marquis Dessolles
Chief of Artillery: General of Division Jean-Baptiste Eblé
Inspector of Infantry: General of Division Balthazar Alexis Henri Schauenburg
Inspector of Cavalry: General of Division François Antoine Louis Bourcier
Chief Engineer: General of Brigade Louis Clemencet
Source:

Right Wing

General of Division Claude Lecourbe in Zurich
General of Division: Dominique Vandamme (9,632 infantry, 540 cavalry)
Generals of Brigade: Henri Antoine Jardon, Anne Gilbert de Laval, Gabriel Jean Joseph Molitor
1st Light Infantry Demi Brigade
36th Line Infantry Demi Brigade
83rd Line Infantry Demi Brigade
94th Line Infantry Demi Brigade
8th Hussar Regiment
General of Division: Jean Thomas Guillaume Lorge (8,238 infantry, 464 cavalry)
Generals of Brigade: François Goullus, François Bontemps
10th Light Infantry Demi Brigade
37th Line Infantry Demi Brigade
84th Line Infantry Demi Brigade
109th Line Infantry Demi Brigade
9th Hussar Regiment
General of Division: Joseph Hélie Désiré Perruquet de Montrichard (8,238 infantry, 464 cavalry)
Generals of Brigade: Joseph Augustin Fournier d'Aultane
10th Light Infantry Demi Brigade
38th Line Infantry Demi Brigade
67th Line Infantry Demi Brigade
General of Division Etienne Marie Antoine Champion de Nansouty (1,500 infantry, 1,280 cavalry)
Unbrigaded:
Combined Grenadiers
25th Cavalry Regiment
11th Dragoon Regiment
12th Chasseurs a Cheval Regiment
Source:

Center

General of Division Laurent Gouvion Saint-Cyr in Basel
General of Division Louis Baraguey d'Hilliers (8,340 infantry, 542 cavalry)
Generals of Brigade: Dominique Joba, François-Xavier Roussel, Just-Pasteur Sabathier
12th Light Infantry Demi Brigade
1st Line Infantry Demi Brigade
15th Line Infantry Demi Brigade
23rd Line Infantry Demi Brigade
2nd Hussar Regiment
General of Division: Jean Victor Tharreau (8,326 infantry, 611 cavalry)
Generals of Brigade: Etienne Heudelet de Bierre, René-François-Jean Aubrée, Charles Victor Woirgard
2nd Light Infantry Demi Brigade
24th Line Infantry Demi Brigade
51st Line Infantry Demi Brigade
101st Line Infantry Demi Brigade
23rd Dragoon Regiment
16th Chasseurs a Cheval Regiment
General of Division: Michel Ney (7,270 infantry, 569 cavalry)
Generals of Brigade: Jean Pierre François Bonet, Charles August Bonnamy
12th Light Infantry Demi Brigade
54th Line Infantry Demi Brigade
76th Line Infantry Demi Brigade
103rd Line Infantry Demi Brigade
8th Chasseurs a Cheval Regiment
General of Brigade Nicolas Ernault des Bruslys (2,474 infantry, 1,616 cavalry)
Generals of Brigade: Louis Michel Antoine Sahuc, Charles Saligny, Jean Louis Debilly
16th Line Infantry Demi Brigade
12th Cavalry Regiment
17th Cavalry Regiment
2nd Dragoon Regiment
5th Chasseurs a Cheval Regiment
Source:

Left Wing

General of Division Gilles Joseph Martin Bruneteau de Sainte-Suzanne in Strasbourg
General of Division Claude-Sylvestre Colaud (2,740 infantry, 981 cavalry)
Generals of Brigade: Jean-Laurent-Justine Lacoste, Jean Pierre Girard-Vieux
48th Line Infantry Demi Brigade
10th Cavalry Regiment
16th Cavalry Regiment
20th Chasseurs a Cheval Regiment
General of Division: Joseph Souham (4,687 infantry, 1,394 cavalry)
Generals of Brigade: Charles Mathieu Isidore Decaen, Jacques-Pierre-Louis Puthod
8th Line Infantry Demi Brigade
95th Line Infantry Demi Brigade
7th Cavalry Regiment
6th Dragoon Regiment
1st Chasseurs a Cheval Regiment
General of Division: Claude Juste Alexandre Legrand (5,286 infantry, 1,094 cavalry)
Generals of Brigade: Jacques Denis Boivin, Jean-Baptiste Drouet 
7th Line Infantry Demi Brigade
27th Line Infantry Demi Brigade
13th Dragoon Regiment
6th Chasseurs a Cheval Regiment
General of Division Henri François Delaborde (2,573 infantry, 286 cavalry)
Generals of Brigade: Jean-Pierre-Portschy Mercier, Henri-Joseph Thüring de Ryss
29th Line Infantry Demi Brigade
65th Line Infantry Demi Brigade
2nd Helvétique Légion
4th Cavalry Regiment
19th Cavalry Regiment
Source:

Reserve
General-in-Chief Moreau
General of Division Antoine Guillaume Delmas (8,635 infantry, 1,031 cavalry)
Generals of Brigade: Jean Baptiste Jacopin, Charles Louis Dieudonne Grandjean, Jean Baptiste Lorcet, Jacques Quétard, Boyer
14th Light Infantry Demi Brigade
46th Line Infantry Demi Brigade
50th Line Infantry Demi Brigade
57th Line Infantry Demi Brigade
108th Line Infantry Demi Brigade
6th Cavalry Regiment
4th Hussar Regiment
11th Chasseurs a Cheval Regiment
General of Division Charles Leclerc (6,035 infantry, 963 cavalry)
Generals of Brigade: Louis Bastoul, Frédéric Henri Walther, Adrien Marie Gabriel Desperrières
14th Light Infantry Demi Brigade
53rd Line Infantry Demi Brigade
89th Line Infantry Demi Brigade
10th Chasseurs a Cheval Regiment
23rd Chasseurs a Cheval Regiment
General of Division Antoine Richepanse (6,848 infantry, 1,187 cavalry)
Generals of Brigade: Antoine Digonet, Pierre François Joseph Durutte
Combined Grenadiers
4th Line Infantry Demi Brigade
50th Line Infantry Demi Brigade
100th Line Infantry Demi Brigade
13th Cavalry Regiment
17th Dragoon Regiment
5th Hussar Regiment
General of Division Jean-Joseph Ange d'Hautpoul (1,504 cavalry)
General of Brigade: Jean-Louis-Brigitte Espagne
1st Carabinier Regiment
2nd Carabinier Regiment
General of Brigade: Denis Felix Devrigny
8th Cavalry Regiment
9th Cavalry Regiment
Source:

Detached
General of Division Louis-Antoine Choin de Montchoisy (7,715 infantry, 519 cavalry) in Switzerland
Generals of Brigade: Joseph Antoine Mainoni, Théodore Chabert
1st Light Infantry Demi Brigade
9th Line Infantry Demi Brigade
28th Line Infantry Demi Brigade
44th Line Infantry Demi Brigade
102nd Line Infantry Demi Brigade
14th Cavalry Regiment
22nd Cavalry Regiment
General of Division Jean François Leval (5,640 infantry, 426 cavalry)
Unbrigaded:
65th Line Infantry Demi Brigade
91st Line Infantry Demi Brigade
110th Line Infantry Demi Brigade
1st Helvétique Légion
3rd Hussar Regiment
General of Division François Xavier Jacob Freytag (2,935 infantry)
Unbrigaded:
29th Line Infantry Demi Brigade
95th Line Infantry Demi Brigade
3rd Helvétique Légion
General of Division Joseph Gilot (750 cavalry)
Unbrigaded:
1st Dragoon Regiment
6th Hussar Regiment
General of Division Alexandre Paul Guérin de Chateaunef-Randon (3,430 infantry, 485 cavalry)
Unbrigaded:
80th Line Infantry Demi Brigade
Polish Danube Legion
15th Cavalry Regiment
24th Cavalry Regiment
General of Division Antoine Laroche Dubouscat (3,100 infantry, 91 cavalry)
Unbrigaded:
20th Line Infantry Demi Brigade
North French Legion
16th Cavalry Regiment
Source:

Notes

References

See also
The following are excellent sources for the full names and ranks of French and Austrian generals of the French Revolution and Napoleonic periods.

Napoleonic Wars orders of battle